Tukavila may refer to:
Tüklə, Azerbaijan
Tükəvilə, Azerbaijan